Founded in 1996, Advance Financial is a fintech company based in Nashville, Tennessee. Advance Financial provides lending decisions on cash loans and other financial services. It employs over 1100 employees and in 2019 was named to the Inc.com 5000 list of the fastest-growing private companies in the country for the eighth year in a row.

Associations

Advance Financial is a member of several trade organizations including Community Financial Services Association of America, Financial Service Centers of America where the founders, Mike & Tina Hodges serve on the board of directors and Online Lenders Alliance.

References

American companies established in 1996
Financial services companies established in 1996
Financial services companies of the United States
Companies based in Nashville, Tennessee

1996 establishments in the United States
1996 establishments in Tennessee
Companies established in 1996